Shawn Nelson (born October 5, 1985) is a former American football tight end. Nelson was selected by the Buffalo Bills in the fourth round of the 2009 NFL Draft. He played college football at Southern Mississippi.

Nelson has also been a member of the New York Jets.

High school
Nelson attended East Ascension High School in Gonzales, Louisiana. He was the high school teammate of San Francisco 49ers defensive lineman Glenn Dorsey.

College
Nelson attended University of Southern Mississippi and finished his college career with 157 receptions totaling 2,054 yards and sixteen touchdowns.

Awards and honors
 MVP of New Orleans Bowl (2005)
 2x First-team All-Conference USA (2006–2007)
 Honorable mention All-Conference USA (2008)

Professional career

Pre-draft
Nelson impressed many scouts with his solid college career and impressive scouting combine numbers. At the NFL Combine, he ran a 4.56 forty-yard dash, bench pressed nineteen reps and posted a vertical jump of thirty three inches. Going into the 2009 NFL Draft, Nelson was regarded as one of the top tight end prospects. He was drafted in the fourth round with the 21st pick (121st overall) by the Buffalo Bills.

Buffalo Bills
In his debut game against the New England Patriots on Monday Night Football, Shawn Nelson caught an 11-yard touchdown pass from quarterback Trent Edwards. The Bills went on to lose the game 24-25. Nelson was suspended without pay for the team’s first four games of the 2010 regular season for violating the NFL Policy and Program for Substances of Abuse. Nelson’s suspension began on Saturday, September 4, 2010. He was eligible to return to the Bills’ active roster on October 4, 2010. Nelson was released by the Bills on September 3, 2011.

New York Jets
Nelson was signed by the New York Jets on October 31, 2011. Nelson was waived by the team on November 22, 2011 due to a non-football related illness.

Blacktips
Nelson was also a member of the Blacktips of the Fall Experimental Football League (FXFL).

References

External links
Southern Miss Golden Eagles bio

1985 births
Living people
American football tight ends
Southern Miss Golden Eagles football players
Buffalo Bills players
New York Jets players
Blacktips (FXFL) players
People from Gonzales, Louisiana
Players of American football from Louisiana